Union Hospital is a for profit hospital in Tai Wai, Sha Tin, New Territories, Hong Kong. It was established on 22 June 1994 and was developed by the Henderson Land Development Co. Ltd.. It is the first private general hospital in the New Territories East part of the Hong Kong SAR.

History

The project for the building of the hospital was divided into two phases. Phase one included a multi-storey main hospital building with four ward floors (which accommodate 200 beds), a three-storey Medical Centre, a 24-storey staff quarters as well as an underground car park with more than 170 spaces. A total gross floor area of 27,756 m² has been constructed and over HK$400 million have already been expended.

The phase two hospital extension project was completed in 2006, with the construction costs exceeding HK$210 million. By constructing four new floors atop the existing building, an extra 107 beds and more new facilities have been provided to cope with the growing demand for hospital services. The additions include the Minimally Invasive Centre, Day Therapy Centre, Surgical Ward, and the 5-star-hotel-like Private Ward.

The Union Hospital is surveyed and accredited by QHA Trent Accreditation of the United Kingdom, a major international healthcare accreditation group.

As of 2008, staff of the hospital are presenting internationally on the subject of medical tourism.

Transport links

Free shuttle bus to and from Tai Wai MTR station
Green minibus: 63S, 68K, 68S, 803, 804, and 812
Bus: 46S, 46X, 80, 80A, 80P, 81S, 82K, 85B, 87B, 88K, 281M, 286X, 985, 985B, and N281

See also 
List of hospitals in Hong Kong
Trent Accreditation Scheme

References

External links

 Union Hospital

Hospital buildings completed in 1994
Hospitals in Hong Kong
Tai Wai
Hospitals established in 1994
1994 establishments in Hong Kong